2wenty 2wo is Tackey & Tsubasa's debut album to be released under avex trax. The album was released on April 28, 2004 in two formats, limited edition and regular edition.

Overview
2wenty 2wo is the debut original studio album released by duo singers Tackey & Tsubasa. The album was released in two formats, limited and regular edition. The limited edition came with a photo booklet. The title of the album, is to commemorate the fact that both of the singers were 22 years old when the album was released.

The remixed version of the song "Sotsugyou: Sayonara wa Ashita no Tameni" on the album is the version that was used as an insert song for the anime series InuYasha.

Track listing

Regular CD Format
 "" – 4:54
 "" – 4:31
 "Pride the End" – 4:02
 "" – 3:48
 "" – 4:40
 "Go On" – 3:45
 "Diamond" – 3:54
 "" – 4:50
 "" – 4:03
 "Love&Tough" – 4:31
 "" – 4:26
 "" – 4:27
 "One Day, One Dream" – 4:21
 "You & I" – 4:55
 " (One Version)" – 6:34

Limited CD Format
 ""
 ""
 "Pride the End"
 ""
 ""
 "Go On"
 "Diamond"
 ""
 "Love&Tough"
 ""
 ""
 "One Day, One Dream"
 "You & I"
 " (One Version)"

Personnel
 Takizawa Hideaki – vocals
 Imai Tsubasa – vocals
 Yoshihiko Chino – guitars (Track #1, #7 & #13) & chorus (Track #7, #9 & #14)
 Takeshi Taneda – bass (Track #1, #9, #13, & #14)
 Masami Yoshikawa – chorus (Track #1)
 Jun Abe – keyboards (Track #2)
 Kenji Suzuki – guitars (Track #2)
 Tetsuo Sakurai – bass (Track #2)
 Tetsuya Takahashi – chorus (Track #2, #5, #7 & #13)
 Yu Takami – guitars (Track #3 & #11) & bass (Track #3)
 Kosaku Tanaka – chorus (Track #3, #7, #10 & #13)
 Eiko Kubo – female chorus  (Track #3 & #4)
 Ayuko Tanaka – female chorus (Track #3)
 Chokkaku – guitars (Track #4)
 Hidetoshi Suzuki – guitars (Track #5)
 Yasutaka Kume – guitars (Track #6 & #10)
 Masayuki Iwata – chorus (Track #6)
 Seiji Akiyama – guitars (Track #8)
 Spin – bass (Track #8)
 Mika Watanabe – AC guitar (Track #9)
 Kosei Kubo – E guitar (Track #9)
 Yoshiaki Muto – guitars (Track #11)
 Audio Highs – bass (Track #11)
 Minoru Komorita – chorus (Track #12)
 Isao Sakuma – trumpet (Track #12)
 Hajime Yamamoto – saxophone (Track #12)
 Hiroyuki Nomura – trombone (Track #12)
 Tetsuya Ochiai – violin (Track #14)

Note: The order of the track numbers is based on the regular edition of the album.

Production
 Art Direction & Design – Kenji Kiyama
 Photograph – Kenji Oyama
 Styling – Akiko Yanagida
 Hair & Make up – Hiromi Michinaka
 Creative Direction – Masahiro Ujie
 Creative Coordinate – Kanako Shino
 Location Coordinate – Tsuyoshi Kato

Charts
Album – Oricon Sales Chart (Japan)
Oricon Sales Chart (Japan)

RIAJ Certification
As of June 2004, "2wenty 2wo" has been certified gold for shipments of over 100,000 by the RIAJ.

References
 

2004 albums
Tackey & Tsubasa albums